Luciano Martín Galletti (born 9 April 1980) is an Argentine retired footballer who played as a right winger.

In a professional career that lasted 14 years he played mostly in Spain, with Zaragoza and Atlético Madrid, but also represented Olympiacos, winning five major titles with the latter club. He was also retired from 2010 to 2013, before returning to active with OFI Crete.

An Argentina international in the 2000s, Galletti appeared with the national team at the 2005 Confederations Cup.

Club career

Early years and Italy
Born in La Plata, Buenos Aires Province, Galletti's career began with Estudiantes de La Plata, where his father Rubén Horacio played as a right-wing forward during the 1970s. He scored once in 24 games in his second season in the Primera División.

In January 1999, Galletti joined Parma A.C. in Italy, but failed to break into the first team, moving in the following transfer window to another club in the country, Serie B's S.S.C. Napoli – loaned by Estudiantes, to where he would return for the 2000–01 campaign.

Zaragoza
Galletti signed with Real Zaragoza from Spain in the 2001 off-season. He made his La Liga debut on 26 August in a 1–2 away loss against RCD Espanyol, and finished his first year with 27 matches and two goals as the season ended in relegation.

From there onwards, Galletti became an undisputed starter for the Aragonese, never appearing in less than 34 contests for the remainder of his spell. In 2003–04 he helped them win the Copa del Rey, scoring the winner in a 3–2 extra time win over Real Madrid.

Atlético Madrid
On 29 July 2005, Galletti joined fellow league side Atlético Madrid for €4 million. He netted his first league goal for his new team on 27 October, closing the scoresheet at home against Cádiz CF (3–0).

In his second season with the Colchoneros, Galletti scored four goals in 36 games as they finished in seventh position.

Olympiacos
On 30 June 2007, Galletti was transferred to Olympiacos F.C. in Greece, for a reported fee of €2.5 million, with the player signing a four-year contract with an annual salary of €1.3 million. On 2 May 2009, he scored Olympiacos‘ 4th goal of the final of the Greek Cup against AEK Athens F.C. giving his team a 4–3 lead but got sent off right after that and watched his team getting equalized but eventually winning the game and the title after a thrilling penalty shoot-out; after that campaign ended and he contributed with a career-best 14 goals to the national championship's conquest, he signed a contract extension linking him to the Piraeus club until 2013 – the new deal contained a release clause fee of €15 million.

In early February 2010, Galletti was diagnosed with severe kidney failure, causing him to miss the rest of the season. He announced his retirement the following summer, aged only 30; in early October 2012, however, he underwent a successful kidney transplant, the donor being his father Rubén.

Galletti returned to Olympiacos on 3 September 2014 after an unassuming spell as player at OFI Crete FC, being appointed scout for Latin America.

International career
Galletti was the top scorer at the 1999 South American Youth Championship with nine goals in only eight games, ranking ahead the likes of Ronaldinho and Roque Santa Cruz as the Argentina under-20s won the competition in Paraguay. He earned 13 caps for the full side, making his debut in 2000 and being selected to the squad that appeared in the 2005 FIFA Confederations Cup, where he played three matches for the eventual runners-up, including the final against Brazil.

Honours

Club
Zaragoza
Copa del Rey: 2003–04
Supercopa de España: 2004

Olympiacos
Super League Greece: 2007–08, 2008–09
Greek Cup: 2007–08, 2008–09
Greek Super Cup: 2007

International
Argentina
South American Youth Championship: 1999
FIFA Confederations Cup runner-up: 2005

Individual
South American Youth Championship Top goalscorer: 1999
Super League Greece Top goalscorer: 2008–09
Super League Greece Foreign Player of the Year: 2008–09
Greek Cup Top assist provider: 2008–09

References

External links

1980 births
Living people
Argentine people of Italian descent
Italian sportspeople of Argentine descent
Citizens of Italy through descent
Footballers from La Plata
Argentine footballers
Association football wingers
Argentine Primera División players
Estudiantes de La Plata footballers
Serie B players
Parma Calcio 1913 players
S.S.C. Napoli players
La Liga players
Segunda División players
Real Zaragoza players
Atlético Madrid footballers
Super League Greece players
Olympiacos F.C. players
OFI Crete F.C. players
Argentina youth international footballers
Argentina under-20 international footballers
Argentina international footballers
2005 FIFA Confederations Cup players
Argentine expatriate footballers
Expatriate footballers in Italy
Expatriate footballers in Spain
Expatriate footballers in Greece
Argentine expatriate sportspeople in Italy
Argentine expatriate sportspeople in Spain
Argentine expatriate sportspeople in Greece
Kidney transplant recipients